Chamaesphecia ruficoronata is a moth of the family Sesiidae. It is found in eastern Turkey.

Adults are almost completely black.

The larvae feed on Salvia species.

References

Moths described in 1998
Sesiidae
Endemic fauna of Turkey